Zawady  is a village in the administrative district of Gmina Baranowo, within Ostrołęka County, Masovian Voivodeship, in east-central Poland.

History
Between 1975 and 1998, the village used to be part of Ostrołęka Voivodeship.

References

Villages in Ostrołęka County